South Africa competed at the 1992 Summer Paralympics in Barcelona, Spain. 10 competitors from South Africa won 8 medals, including 4 gold, 1 silver and 3 bronze and finished 27th in the medal table.

Flag

The team used a specially designed sporting flag for these games, which was also used at the 1992 Summer Olympic Games. The flag consisted of a white field charged with a grey diamond, which represented the countries mineral wealth, three cascading bands of blue, orange and green, which represented the sea, the land and agriculture respectively and the Olympic rings.

See also 
 South Africa at the Paralympics
 South Africa at the 1992 Summer Olympics

References 

South Africa at the Paralympics
1992 in South African sport
Nations at the 1992 Summer Paralympics